Brosimum parinarioides, also called leite de amapá, is an evergreen tree which grows in the semi-arid to humid tropical lowlands of South America. It can reach a height of up to 32 m.

Uses
Brosimum parinarioides can be used in carbon farming, as it is a canopy tree in rainforests.

It is used for medicinal purposes, as an edible milk, and for its wild harvested nuts.

Brosimum parinarioides can be used as an adulterant of balata. (Balata is "a gum or latex made from tree sap and resembling rubber" which can be made into gaskets, chewing gum, or a gutta-percha substitute.)

References

Perennial protein crops
parinarioides
Plant milk